Fifi Blows Her Top is a 1958 short subject directed by Jules White starring American slapstick comedy team The Three Stooges (Moe Howard, Larry Fine and Joe Besser). It is the 184th entry in the series released by Columbia Pictures starring the comedians, who released 190 shorts for the studio between 1934 and 1959.

Plot
The Stooges reminisce about their wartime romances in Europe. After they finish their tales, they discover that Joe's girl Fifi (Vanda Dupre), whom he left behind in Paris, has moved in next door. The only problem is that she is now married to a very evil jealous and unappreciative husband (Philip Van Zandt).

Typical Stooge antics result in ruining Fifi's dress, and dressing her in a pair of pajamas is an invitation for her husband to enter the scene. The husband turns out to be a real cad, and when Fifi overhears him tell about his plans to find a new wife, she clobbers him and goes back to Joe.

Cast

Credited
 Moe Howard as Moe
 Larry Fine as Larry
 Joe Besser as Joe
 Vanda Dupre as Fifi
 Philip Van Zandt as Mort, Fifi's husband (final film)
 Harriette Tarler as Parisian waitress
 Christine McIntyre as Katrina (stock footage)

Uncredited
 Joe Palma as Military Policeman
 Heinie Conklin as Bartender (final film)
 Yvette Reynard/Marie Monteil as Maria (stock footage)
 Al Thompson as Sleeping Man in Restaurant (stock footage)
 Jackie Kening Sr. as first male Cafe customer
 Harry Kening as second male Cafe customer
 Suzanne Ridgeway as female Cafe customer

Production notes
Fifi Blows Her Top is a primarily a reworking of Laurel and Hardy's Unaccustomed As We Are (1929) and Block-Heads (1938) while incorporating several stock scenes from the Stooges' Love at First Bite (1950). New footage was filmed over two days on February 12–13, 1957.

Fifi Blows Her Top marks the final appearance of longtime foil Philip Van Zandt. The actor committed suicide shortly after filming wrapped, and did not live to see its release.

See also
 List of American films of 1958

References

External links
 
 
Fifi Blows Her Top at threestooges.net

1958 films
1958 comedy films
American black-and-white films
The Three Stooges film remakes
Films directed by Jules White
The Three Stooges films
Columbia Pictures short films
1950s English-language films
1950s American films